Samuel Wyche Getzen (February 13, 1898 – April 11, 1960) was an American lawyer and politician.

Samuel Wyche Getzen was born on February 13, 1898, in Lake City, Florida, the son of James Culbreath Getzen (1866–1937), a farmer and naval stores operator, and Willie Florence née Thompson (1869–1955). He grew up in Sumter County, Florida, attending Columbia College and the University of Florida. He married Josephine Brooks (1902–1995) in 1921.

He was first elected to the Florida House of Representatives at the age of 23, and was re-elected through 1929, when he served as Speaker of the House. In 1929, he was part of a lobbying investigation by the U.S. Congress. From 1931 to 1933, he served in the Florida Senate, representing the 38th District. He returned to the House of Representatives in 1935.

Getzen died April 11, 1960, at the age of 62 in Alachua County, Florida.

References

1898 births
1960 deaths
People from Lake City, Florida
Democratic Party Florida state senators
20th-century American politicians
University of Florida alumni
Florida lawyers
Speakers of the Florida House of Representatives
Democratic Party members of the Florida House of Representatives
20th-century American lawyers